This is a list of the National Register of Historic Places listings in Coleman County, Texas.

This is intended to be a complete list of properties listed on the National Register of Historic Places in Coleman County, Texas. There is one property listed on the National Register in the county.

Current listings 

The publicly disclosed locations of National Register properties and districts may be seen in a mapping service provided.

|}

See also

National Register of Historic Places listings in Texas
Recorded Texas Historic Landmarks in Coleman County

References

Coleman County, Texas
Coleman County
Buildings and structures in Coleman County, Texas